Mark Anthony Spears, known professionally as Sounwave, is an American hip-hop producer and songwriter from Compton, California, and an original member of the Californian hip-hop label Top Dawg Entertainment. Sounwave has worked on every Kendrick Lamar studio album since Lamar's 2009 self-titled EP, including the Grammy Award-nominated album Good Kid, M.A.A.D City, Grammy Award winning To Pimp a Butterfly, and the multi-Grammy and Pulitzer Prize–winning album Damn. He has received two Grammy Awards: Best Rap Song (2015) for "Alright", and Best Rap Album (2017) for Damn.

Early life 

Hailing from Compton, Sounwave credits "Up Jumps da Boogie" by Timbaland as the first hip hop instrumental he ever listened to. From the age of ten, he started using a Korg drum machine to make simple drum beats. From there, he graduated to a 4-track machine and then to the MTV Music Generator for PlayStation. After using that for a while, he hooked up with rapper Bishop Lamont from Carson, California, and a song he produced for him with MTV Music Generator received local radio placement.

Career

2005–2008 

In 2005, Sounwave was originally discovered by Top Dawg Entertainment co-founder Terrence "Punch" Henderson, who had him meet with TDE CEO Anthony "Top Dawg" Tiffith. Tiffith was originally unimpressed with Sounwave; however, Sounwave persisted and honed his craft, which ended up "blowing away" Tiffith. It was then he became a member of Digi+Phonics, an American hip hop production team, composed of fellow California-based record producers Tae Beast, Dave Free and Willie B. They served as the main in-house producers for Carson-based record label, Top Dawg Entertainment. Digi+Phonics worked significantly on projects from all the members of hip hop supergroup Black Hippy, who are also signed to Top Dawg and is composed of rappers Kendrick Lamar, Jay Rock, Schoolboy Q, and Ab-Soul.

2009–2016 

Sounwave's earliest work for Top Dawg Entertainment surfaced on the self-titled Kendrick Lamar and Jay Rock's compilation track "Fa Sho", in 2009 and 2010 respectively. In 2011, Sounwave produced the bulk of Lamar's mixtape/album Section.80, which landed him on Complexs "15 New Producers to Watch" list. He also produced three songs on Lamar's critically acclaimed second album Good Kid, M.A.A.D City (2012). Sounwave is known for producing Kendrick Lamar's hit single "Bitch Don't Kill My Vibe", among other songs such as "M.A.A.D. City", "A.D.H.D" and Schoolboy Q's "There He Go". In 2014, he earned a placement on Top Dawg Entertainment artist Isaiah Rashad's Cilvia Demo and produced "Hoover Street" and "Prescription/Oxymoron" on Schoolboy Q's Oxymoron. Outside of his work with artists in the Top Dawg Entertainment label, he worked with Flo Rida on the song "Finally Here" from the latter's second album R.O.O.T.S. (2009). Sounwave is also credited with production on four tracks on Schoolboy Q's fourth studio album, Blank Face LP.

2016–present 

In 2016, Sounwave worked alongside Lamar and Top Dawg Entertainment CEO Tiffith as co-writer, A&R, and producer of Black Panther: The Album, the official soundtrack to the film Black Panther. His work on the film's single "All the Stars" with Lamar and SZA earned nominations for Best Original Song for the Academy Awards, Golden Globe Awards, and Critics' Choice Movie Awards.

Outside of Top Dawg Entertainment, Sounwave has collaborated with Beyoncé, Mary J Blige, and many others. In 2019, Sounwave co-wrote and co-produced the song "London Boy" for Taylor Swift's seventh studio album Lover (2019).

Additionally in 2019, he along with singer and songwriter Sam Dew and producer/musician Jack Antonoff released a project titled "Red Hearse" under the same name.

Songwriting and production discography

Songs

2011 

 "A.D.H.D" – Kendrick Lamar
 "Hol' Up" – Kendrick Lamar
 "No Make-Up (Her Vice)" – Kendrick Lamar
 "The Spiteful Chant" – Kendrick Lamar, Schoolboy Q

2012 

 "m.A.A.d city" – Kendrick Lamar

2013 

 "Bitch, Don't Kill My Vibe" – Kendrick Lamar

2014 

 "Break the Bank" – Schoolboy Q

2015 

 "Alright" – Kendrick Lamar
 "King Kunta" – Kendrick Lamar
 "Complexion" – Kendrick Lamar
 "Mortal Man" – Kendrick Lamar
Two Matches – Mac Miller, Ab-Soul

2016 

 "That Part" – Schoolboy Q, Kanye West
 "John Muir" — Schoolboy Q

2017 

 "Element" – Kendrick Lamar
 "Feel" – Kendrick Lamar
 "God" – Kendrick Lamar
 "Love" – Kendrick Lamar, Zacari
 "Loyalty" – Kendrick Lamar, Rihanna
 "Lust" – Kendrick Lamar
 "XXX" – Kendrick Lamar
 "Yah" – Kendrick Lamar
"Goodbye" – Bleachers (additional production)
 "Foreign Girls" – Bleachers (additional production)

2018 

 "All the Stars" – Kendrick Lamar, SZA
 "Big Shot" – Kendrick Lamar, Travis Scott
 "Black Panther" – Kendrick Lamar
 "Bloody Waters" – Ab-Soul, Anderson .Paak, James Blake
 "I Am" – Jorja Smith, Kendrick Lamar
 "King's Dead" – Jay Rock, Kendrick Lamar, Future, James Blake
 "Opps" – Kendrick Lamar, Vince Staples, Yugen Blakrok
 "Paramedic!" – Kendrick Lamar, SOB x RBE, Zacari
 "Seasons" – Mozzy, Sjava, Reason
 "The Ways" – Kendrick Lamar, Khalid, Swae Lee
 "X" – Kendrick Lamar, Schoolboy Q, 2 Chainz, Saudi

2019 

"Nile" – Kendrick Lamar, Beyoncé
"London Boy" – Taylor Swift
"holy terrain" – FKA twigs
2020

 "Fair Chance" – Thundercat, Ty Dolla $ign, Lil B
 "Overseas" – Thundercat, Zack Fox
 "Intro" – Chloe x Halle
 "Forgive Me" – Chloe x Halle
 "Ea'alah" – Spillage Village, JID, EARTHGANG

2021

 "vent" – Baby Keem

2022

 "Ride the Dragon" – FKA twigs
 "N95" – Kendrick Lamar
 "Lavender Haze" – Taylor Swift
 "Karma" – Taylor Swift
 "Glitch" – Taylor Swift
 "Gang'Nem" - Ab-Soul

Albums 

Section.80 – Kendrick Lamar (2011)
Black Panther – Kendrick Lamar (2018)
Lover – Taylor Swift (2019)
The Lion King: The Gift – Beyoncé (2019)
Midnights – Taylor Swift (2022)

Awards and nominations 

 Academy Awards
 Nomination: Best Achievement in Music Written for Motion Pictures (Original Song) – "All the Stars " (2018)
 Golden Globe Awards
 Nomination: Best Achievement in Music Written for Motion Pictures (Original Song) – "All the Stars " (2018)
 Grammy Awards
 Won: Best Rap Song – "Alright" (2015)
 Nomination: Album of the Year – Good Kid, M.A.A.D City (2013)
 Nomination: Album of the Year – To Pimp a Butterfly (2015)
 Nomination: Song of the Year – "Alright " (2015)
 Nomination: Album of the Year – Damn (2017)
 Nomination: Record of the Year – "All the Stars " (2018)
 Nomination: Album of the Year – Black Panther (2018)
 Nomination: Song of the Year – "All the Stars " (2018)
 Nomination: Best Rap Song – "King's Dead " (2018)
 Nomination: Best Song Written for Visual Media – "All the Stars " (2018)
 Nomination: Grammy Award for Best Rap Album - “Mr. Morale & the Big Steppers” (2018)
 Guild of Music Supervisors Awards
 Nomination: Best Achievement in Music Written for Motion Pictures (Original Song) – "All the Stars" (2018)

References

External links 

African-American male rappers
African-American songwriters
Grammy Award winners for rap music
Juno Award for International Album of the Year winners
Living people
Musicians from Compton, California
Rappers from California
Songwriters from California
Top Dawg Entertainment artists
West Coast hip hop musicians
21st-century American rappers
Year of birth missing (living people)
21st-century American male musicians
21st-century African-American musicians
American male songwriters